UTC+03:00 is an identifier for a time offset from UTC of +03:00. In areas using this time offset, the time is three hours later than the Coordinated Universal Time (UTC).
Following the ISO 8601 standard, a time with this offset would be written as, for example, 2019-02-08T23:36:06+03:00.

As standard time (year-round)
Principal cities: Moscow, Saint Petersburg, Doha, Riyadh, Baghdad, Nairobi, Dire Dawa, Addis Ababa, Manama, Sana'a, Aden, Minsk, Kuwait City, Asmara, Antananarivo, Kampala, Amman, Damascus

Africa

East Africa
Comoros
Djibouti
Eritrea
Ethiopia
France
French Southern and Antarctic Lands
Scattered Islands in the Indian Ocean
Bassas da India, Europa Island and Juan de Nova Island
Mayotte
Kenya
Madagascar
Somalia
Somaliland (disputed territory)
South Africa
Prince Edward Islands
Tanzania
Uganda

Antarctica
Some bases in Antarctica. See also Time in Antarctica
Japan
Showa Station

Asia

Arabia Standard Time

Arabia Standard Time, or AST (indicated by KSA on some Arabic TV stations), is used by some of the countries in the Middle East. As this time zone is predominantly in the equatorial region, there is no significant change in day length throughout the year, so daylight saving time is not observed. Between 1982 and 2007, Iraq observed Arabia Daylight Time (UTC+04:00) but the government abolished DST in March 2008.

Arabia Standard Time is used by the following countries:

Bahrain
Iraq
Jordan
Kuwait
Qatar
Saudi Arabia
Syria
Yemen

Europe

Most of European Russia, including Moscow, Saint Petersburg, Rostov-on-Don, Novaya Zemlya, Franz Josef Land. From October 26, 2014 Moscow and most other parts of European Russia started using UTC+03:00 again, year-round. Also on September 7, 2016, Turkey started using UTC+03:00 year-round. Besides the names mentioned above, the name "Eastern Europe Forward Time"' (EEFT) is sometimes used.
Belarus
Russia – Moscow Time
Central Federal District
North Caucasian Federal District
Northwestern Federal District
Except Kaliningrad Oblast
Southern Federal District
Except Astrakhan Oblast
Volga Federal District
Except Samara Oblast, Saratov Oblast, Udmurtia, Ulyanovsk Oblast, Bashkortostan, Orenburg Oblast and Perm Krai
Turkey – Time in Turkey
Ukraine
Crimea (Crimea Peninsula) or Republic of Crimea, part of (administered by Russia) Donetsk, Luhansk, Kherson and Zaporozhye regions

Caucasus region
Georgia (while Georgia remains within UTC+04:00, its two breakaway regions have opted to use UTC+03:00) this includes:
 Abkhazia
 South Ossetia

As daylight saving time (Northern Hemisphere summer only)

Principal cities: Kyiv, Bucharest, Athens, Jerusalem, Sofia

 Europe 
Bulgaria
Cyprus
Northern Cyprus
Estonia
Finland
Åland
Greece
Latvia
Lithuania
Moldova
Transnistria
Romania
Ukraine
Except Crimea, part of Donetsk and Luhansk regions
United Kingdom
Akrotiri and Dhekelia

Asia
Israel
Lebanon

Africa
Egypt.

 Discrepancies between official UTC+03:00 and geographical UTC+03:00 

 Areas in UTC+03:00 longitudes using other time zones 
Using UTC+04:00

Caucasus region:
 Georgia, excluding Abkhazia and South Ossetia
 Armenia and Artsakh
 Azerbaijan
Russia, with parts of its territories:
 Astrakhan, Samara, Saratov and Ulyanovsk (with an exception of the very east)
 Western half of the of Udmurtia
United Arab Emirates
 The westernmost region of the Emirate of Abu Dhabi
Seychelles
 Aldabra Group
 Cosmoledo Atoll
 Farquhar Group
French Southern and Antarctic Lands
 Crozet Islands

Using UTC+03:30

Iran
 The western part, including Tehran

Using UTC+02:00

Ukraine (standard time)
 The easternmost part, including Luhansk
Sudan
 The very easternmost part in the country
Mozambique
 Most of the northeast, including Montepuez and Nampula

 Areas outside UTC+03:00 longitudes using UTC+03:00 time 

 Areas between 67°30′ E and 82°30′ E ("physical" UTC+05:00) 
Russia
 The very east of Severny Island with 69°2' E as the easternmost point

 Areas between 52°30' E and 67°30' E ("physical" UTC+04:00) 
Yemen
 Socotra, the largest island in the Socotra Archipelago
 The very easternmost part of Al-Mahrah
Saudi Arabia
 The easternmost part of Sharqiyah
Russia
 Most of Franz Josef Land, Yuzhny Island, and most of Severny Island (with an exception of the very east)
 Some parts of the Russian mainland (Komi Republic, Nenets Autonomous Okrug, east of Kirov Oblast and Tatarstan)

 Areas between 22°30' E and 37°30' E ("physical" UTC+02:00) 
Tanzania
 The western part, including Mwanza and Mbeya
Uganda
Kenya
 The western part, including nation's capital Nairobi
Ethiopia
 The western part, including Nekemte and Jimma
Saudi Arabia
 The northwesternmost part, including Tabuk
Turkey
 Most parts of the country, including Istanbul and nation's capital Ankara
Ukraine
 Part of Donetsk and Luhansk regions
Belarus
Russia
 The western part, including Saint Petersburg, half of Moscow and Crimea

Notes
The westernmost point at UTC+03:00 is the westernmost point of contiguous Russia, near Lavry, Pskov Oblast (27°19' E). The time zone employed there (corresponding to 45°E) is 17°41' E of physical time, i.e. roughly 1 hour and 11 minutes ahead of physical time, making for the largest overall discrepancy between time used and physical time for UTC+03:00.
The easternmost point at UTC+03:00 is Cape Zhelaniya, Severny Island, Novaya Zemlya, Russia (69°06' E). The time zone employed there (corresponding to 45°E) is 24°06' W of physical time, i.e. roughly 1 hour and 36 minutes behind physical time, making for the largest discrepancy between time used and physical time for UTC+03:00.
On February 8, 2011, Russian president Dmitry Medvedev issued a decree cancelling daylight saving time in Russia. Under the decree, all clocks in Russia advanced by 1 hour on March 27, 2011, but did not change back the following October, effectively making Kaliningrad Time UTC+03:00 permanently, and Moscow Time UTC+04:00 permanently. This proved unpopular because of the dark mornings, children walking to school and people going to work in complete darkness. On October 26, 2014, Russia permanently returned to standard time by setting the clocks back by 1 hour effectively making Kaliningrad Time UTC+02:00 permanently and Moscow Time UTC+03:00 permanently.
Ukraine had UTC+02:00 plus regularly EEST from 1990 till 2011 (in years 1981–1990 Moscow Summer Time) until the Ukrainian parliament added 1 hour "on the territory of Ukraine from March 27, 2011" and canceled daylight saving time on September 20, 2011, de facto'' making EEST (UTC+03:00) the new standard time. After strong criticism from the mass media, on 18 October 2011 the Ukrainian parliament cancelled its previous decision.

See also
Time in Antarctica – some stations use this time zone
Time in Ethiopia
Time in Russia
Time in Turkey

References

UTC offsets